Barry Callebaut is a Belgian-Swiss  cocoa processor and chocolate manufacturer, with an average annual production of 2.3 million tonnes of cocoa & chocolate (fiscal year 2021/2022).
It was created in 1996 through the merging of the Belgian chocolate producer Callebaut and the French company Cacao Barry. It is currently based in Zürich, Switzerland, and operates in over 30 countries worldwide. It was created in its present form by Klaus Johann Jacobs.

Its customers include multinational and national branded consumer goods manufacturers and artisanal users of chocolate (chocolatiers, pastry chefs, bakeries, and caterers).

History

Cacao Barry
Cacao Barry was founded in Hardricourt, France in 1842, by Charles Barry, an Englishman with a passion for exploring Africa. During Barry's travels to Africa he came in contact with cocoa beans, a major component in the production of chocolate. The company began producing chocolate in 1911.

In 1952, Cacao Barry became active from bean to gourmet chocolate. In 1992, the holding company Société Centrale d’Investissement (SCI) gained control of Cacao Barry, then transferred 49% of the company's capital to Compagnie Nationale à Portefeuille (CNP), an investment fund in financier Albert Frere’s group. SCI's management approach favoured greater penetration of the UK market with the consequent opening of a new production site in the United Kingdom. In 1994, shortly before the merger of 1996, they launched the Pure Origine of Cacao Barry brand.

Callebaut
Callebaut was a Belgian company, founded by Eugenius Callebaut as a brewery in Wieze, Belgium, in 1850. The brewery began producing chocolate bars in 1911 and soon switched entirely to chocolate production. They began producing chocolate couverture in 1925. In the 1950s, Callebaut, which was still a family-run business, began exporting its products to other European and North American markets, leveraging the fact that Belgian chocolate had earned an excellent reputation for its quality. In 1981, Interfood, a subsidiary of Tobler-Suchard, bought the company. Bernard Callebaut, heir of the founding family, moved to Canada, where he opened a new chocolate factory named Chocolaterie Bernard Callebaut. In 1983, Klaus Jacobs acquired full control of Interfood, the holding company that controlled Callebaut, and became an international confectionery leader. After a series of acquisitions in the industry, the company merged with the US company Kraft in 1987, creating Kraft Jacobs Suchard. Klaus Jacobs retained Callebaut business.

Merger and IPO

Belgian chocolate producer Callebaut and French chocolate company Cacao Barry merged in 1996 to form Barry Callebaut. In 1998, Barry Callebaut was listed on the SIX Swiss Exchange. From a business standpoint, the new Franco-Belgian confectionery company continued to grow, with Jacobs Suchard assigning it the management of Van Houten, the Dutch chocolate and cocoa powder maker founded in 1815 in Amsterdam, which Jacobs Suchard had acquired in 1986. Barry Callebout also expanded its range of products, launching new brands on the market, like Bensdorp (cocoa powder), The Barry and Callebaut (gourmet chocolate and cocoa-based products) and new lines under the Barry Callebaut brand for industrial use, including cocoa powder, cocoa butter, liqueur and chocolate.

In 1988, the company acquired the US-based confectionery company Van Leer Chocolate and, the following year, it acquired the Swiss Carma-Pfister AG. That same year, Barry Callebaut gained access to the South American market when it bought the Brazilian company Chadler Industrial de Bahia.

In 2002, under the leadership of its new CEO, Patrick G. De Maeseneire, Barry Callebaut acquired the German company Stollwerck for $225 million, thereby taking over the 17 brands under its control, including Sarotti.

The following year, it bought Brach's through the assumption of $16 million worth of debt. In 2004, it acquired AM Foods K/S, a company based in Denmark and specialised in croissanterie and chocolate. In 2007, Barry Callebaut signed an agreement with fellow Swiss brand Nestlé to buy its French site in Dijon, plants for the production of cocoa and liquid chocolate in bulk at the Italian site in San Sisto (Perugia), and to supply Nestlé with 43,000 tonnes of chocolate products per year in France, Italy and Russia. Before the year was out, it had acquired FPI-Food Processing International in the United States and KL Kepong Cocoa Products Sdn Bhd in Port Klang Malaysia. In 2009, Barry Callebaut bought the Spanish chocolate producer Chocovic S.A. These international acquisitions took place in the space of a few years, leading CEO De Maeseneire to announce, "We did not want Barry Callebaut to be merely European, we wanted it to become a global company". Two years later, the company decided to transfer the Stollwerck division to the Belgian Baronie Group, in turn controlled by the Sweet Group private equity firm, disposing of most of its retail operations in European markets.

In 2017, Barry Callebaut acquired D’Orsogna Dolciaria, an Italian company based in Abruzzo and specialised in the production of amaretto biscuits, confectionery decorations and similar products.

Ruby Chocolate

In September 2017, the Swiss company launched a new type of chocolate, Ruby, named for its reddish pink color. The pink hue is not created by adding artificial colouring or through chemical manipulation, but is the result of the color of the cocoa beans used to produce the chocolate, Ruby cocoa beans, cultivated in countries with specific climatic conditions, like Ecuador, Brazil and the Ivory Coast, and processed naturally by Barry Callebaut. Barry Callebaut presented what it calls "the fourth type of chocolate" at a private event held for industry experts in Shanghai, since the company sees China as a privileged market for its business.

In January 2018, Nestlé Japan Ltd. launched a Ruby chocolate-based Ruby Sublime Kit Kat in Japan, becoming the first global brand to use the pink chocolate formula developed by Barry Callebaut. The product was also launched in April of the same year in the UK, the first Western nation to test the pink Kit Kat created using Barry Callebaut's Ruby cocoa beans on a commercial scale.

Acquisition and openings history
 1999 Acquisition of Carma AG in Switzerland
 2002 Acquisition of the Stollwerck Group in Germany
 2003 Acquisition of Dutch Group Graverboom B.V. (including Luijckx B.V.)
 2004 Acquisition of the vending mix business of ASM Foods in Sweden
 2004 Opening of a sales office in Tokyo, Japan
 2005 Opening of a chocolate factory in California, U.S.
 2007 Opening of a chocolate factory in Chekhov (near Moscow), Russia
 2007 Major outsourcing contracts with Nestlé, Hershey's and Cadbury
 2007 Acquisition of a cocoa factory in Eddystone, Pennsylvania, U.S.
 2008 Opening of a chocolate factory in Suzhou (near Shanghai), China
 2008 Signing of the acquisition of chocolate production capacity from Morinaga & Company, Japan
 2008 Opening of Chocolate Academies in Suzhou (China), Zundert (Netherlands), Mumbai (India), Chekhov (Russia) and Chicago (U.S.)
 2008 Acquisition of a 60% stake in KL-Kepong Cocoa Products Sdn Bhd in Malaysia
 2008 Strategic partnership with Biolands of Tanzania
 2008 Sale of African consumer business
 2008 Opening of a specialty factory for frozen pastry in Alicante, Spain
 2009 Opening of a chocolate factory in Monterrey, Mexico
 2009 Sale of Van Houten Singapur consumer business to Hershey's
 2009 Acquisition of Danish vending mix company Eurogran
 2009 Acquisition of Spanish chocolate maker Chocovic, S.A.
 2010 Opening of a chocolate factory in Extrema, Brazil
 2010 Signing of a long-term strategic partnership agreement with Kraft Foods Inc.
 2011 Acquisition of remaining 40% stake in Barry Callebaut Malaysia Sdn Bhd, formerly KLK Cocoa
 2011 Expansion of the existing supply and innovation agreement with Hershey
 2011 Signing of long-term outsourcing agreement with Chocolates Turín, Mexico
 2011 Sale of Stollwerck to Baronie Group
 2011 Joint venture with P.T. Comextra Majora to form P.T. Barry Callebaut Comextra Indonesia
 2012 Acquisition of la Morella nuts in Spain
 2012 Acquisition of Mona Lisa Food Products, Inc. in the U.S.
 2012 Launch of "Cocoa Horizons" initiative based on strategic pillar "Sustainable Cocoa”
 2012 Purchasing Chatham facility from Batory Industries Company in Ontario (Canada)
 2012 Signing of long-term outsourcing/partnership agreements with Unilever, Grupo Bimbo (Mexico), and Morinaga (Japan)
 2013 Opening of a chocolate factory in Eskişehir, Turkey
 2021 Opening of the largest chocolate distribution centre in Lokeren, Belgium
 2022 Opening of a chocolate factory in Duran, Ecuador

In 2005, Barry Callebaut introduced a "healthy" chocolate product called ACTICOA, which contains higher levels of polyphenol antioxidants (cocoa flavanols) than any other chocolate; some evidence indicates these flavanols have particular health benefits.

Criticism

Deforestation 
On 13 September 2017 NGO Mighty Earth released a report documenting findings that Barry Callebaut purchases cocoa grown illegally in national parks and other protected forests in the Ivory Coast.

The report accused Barry Callebaut of endangering the forest habitats of chimpanzees, elephants and other wildlife populations by purchasing cocoa linked to deforestation. As a result of cocoa production, 7 of the 23 Ivorian protected areas have been almost entirely converted to cocoa. Barry Callebaut was notified of the findings of Mighty Earth's investigation and did not deny that the company sourced its cocoa from protected areas in the Ivory Coast.

A follow-on report by Mighty Earth dated 7 December 2018 indicated little to no progress had been made in the year since Barry Callebaut and other signatories had committed to the Cocoa and Forests Initiative.

Child slavery 
In 2021, Barry Callebaut was named in a class action lawsuit filed by eight former child slaves from Mali who allege that the company aided and abetted their enslavement on cocoa plantations in Ivory Coast. The suit accused Barry Callebaut (along with Nestlé, Cargill, Mars, Incorporated, Olam International, The Hershey Company, and Mondelez International) of knowingly engaging in forced labor, and the plaintiffs sought damages for unjust enrichment, negligent supervision, and intentional infliction of emotional distress.

Salmonella 
On June 27, 2022 Salmonella contamination was detected in a batch of chocolates at the Wieze, Belgium plant halting production. Production was resumed gradually after August 8, going back to full capacity by October 20, 2022

See also

 List of bean-to-bar chocolate manufacturers

References

External links
 
 Associated Press Report
 Forbes News

Food and drink companies of Switzerland
Manufacturing companies based in Zürich
Swiss chocolate companies
Companies listed on the SIX Swiss Exchange